Tantalum(V) fluoride is the inorganic compound with the formula TaF5.  It is one of the principal molecular compounds of tantalum.  Characteristic of some other pentafluorides, the compound is volatile but exists as an oligomer in the solid state.

Preparation and structure
It is prepared by treating tantalum metal with fluorine gas.  NbF5 is prepared similarly.

Solid and molten TaF5 is tetrameric, consisting of four TaF6 centers linked via bridging fluoride centers.  Gaseous TaF5 adopts the trigonal pyramidal structure with D3h symmetry.

Reactions and derivatives
The tendency of TaF5 to form clusters in the solid state indicates the Lewis acidity of the monomer. With neutral Lewis bases, such as diethyl ether TaF5 forms adducts.

 is used in combination with HF as a catalyst for the alkylation of alkanes and alkenes and for the protonation of aromatic compounds. The  system is stable in reducing environments, unlike . High concentrations of HF favor the hexafluoride by virtue of the formation of :

 + HF   + 
The salts M3TaF8 have been crystallized.  For K+ = M+, the crystals consist of  anions together with fluoride that does not coordinate to Ta(V).  For M+ = M+, the crystals features .

Relevance to separation of Ta and Nb
In the Marignac process, Nb and Ta are separated by fractional crystallization of K2TaF7 from solutions of hydrofluoric acid.  Under these conditions, niobium forms K2NbOF5, which is more soluble than K2TaF7.  Reduction of K2TaF7 with sodium gives metallic Ta.

References

Fluorides
Tantalum compounds
Metal halides